The 1959–60 season was Manchester United's 58th season in the Football League, and their 15th consecutive season in the top division of English football. They finished seventh in the league, and striker Dennis Viollet scored a record 32 league goals in a season for the club.

First Division

FA Cup

Squad statistics

References

Manchester United F.C. seasons
Manchester United